The 1996 Campeonato Nacional, known as Campeonato Nacional Copa Banco del Estado 1996 for sponsorship purposes, was the 64th season of top-flight football in Chile. Colo-Colo won their 20th title following a 1–1 home draw against Audax Italiano on 11 November. Universidad Católica also qualified for the next Copa Libertadores as Liguilla winners.

Final table

Results

Top goalscorers

Liguilla Pre-Copa Libertadores

Semifinals

Finals 

Universidad Católica qualified for the 1997 Copa Libertadores

Copa CONMEBOL 1996 play-off
Goal difference didn't count; in case of equal points, extra time was played.

Cobreloa qualified for the 1996 Copa CONMEBOL

Promotion/relegation play-offs

See also
1996 Copa Chile

Notes

References
RSSSF Page
national-football-teams

Primera División de Chile seasons
Chile
1996 in Chilean football